Liu Jue (Liu Chüeh, traditional: 劉玨, simplified: 刘珏); ca. 1409–1472 was a Chinese landscape painter, calligrapher, and poet during the Ming Dynasty (1368–1644).

Liu was born in Changzhou in the Jiangsu province. His style name was 'Tingmei' and his sobriquet was 'Wan'an'. Liu's painting used a plump brush stroke style, which later influenced Shen Zhou.

References

External links
Landscapes Clear and Radiant: The Art of Wang Hui (1632-1717), an exhibition catalog from The Metropolitan Museum of Art (fully available online as PDF), which contains material on Liu Jue (see index)

1409 births
1472 deaths
Ming dynasty landscape painters
Painters from Changzhou
Ming dynasty calligraphers
Ming dynasty poets
Poets from Jiangsu
Writers from Changzhou